Home Cooking is a 1924 silent short film directed by Herman C. Raymaker and produced by and starring Monty Banks.

A print survives in the Library of Congress collection.

Cast
Monty Banks

References

External links
 Home Cooking at IMDb.com

1924 films
American silent short films
1924 comedy films
American black-and-white films
1924 short films
American comedy short films
Silent American comedy films
Films directed by Herman C. Raymaker
1920s American films